Nancy Anna Francina Coolen, known as Nance (born 10 September 1973 in Asten, North Brabant, Netherlands) is a Dutch television  presenter and singer, and the former lead vocalist of Eurodance act Twenty 4 Seven.

At the age of 15, Nance was discovered in a club by dance producer Ruud van Rijen, who created the dance-act Twenty 4 Seven around her and rapper Captain Hollywood, who was later replaced by Stay C. The act scored several hits, most notably Slave to the Music'.

In 1996 Nance left Twenty 4 Seven to embark on a solo career. Around the same time she began working as a presenter for Dutch television by occasionally hosting the Dutch Top 40 for TMF Nederland. Nance moved on to various game shows, such as Liefde is... for RTL 5 and Rappatongo'' for TROS, before taking over as the host of Lingo, which she presented until 2005.

Singles with Twenty 4 Seven

Solo

References

External links
Official website 

1973 births
Living people
Dutch television presenters
Dutch women television presenters
People from Asten, Netherlands
21st-century Dutch singers
Nationaal Songfestival presenters